Ikonnikov's bat (Myotis ikonnikovi) is a species of vesper bat.  An adult Ikonnikov's bat has a body length of 4.2-5.1 cm, a tail of 3.1-4.0 cm, and a wing length of 3.3-3.6 cm.  It is found in eastern Siberia, the Ussuri region, Sakhalin, Hokkaido and Honshu (Japan), and the Korean Peninsula.

References

Mouse-eared bats
Mammals of Korea
Bats of Asia
Mammals described in 1912